San Dionisio is the Spanish-language version of Saint Dionysius.  It may refer to:

Places

El Salvador
San Dionisio, Usulután

Mexico
San Dionisio del Mar, Oaxaca
San Dionisio Ocotepec, Oaxaca
San Dionisio Ocotlan, Oaxaca

Nicaragua
San Dionisio, Matagalpa

Philippines
San Dionisio, Iloilo
San Dionisio, Parañaque

United States
Redoubt San Dionisio, a fortification in Russian America, near today's Wrangell, Alaska

See also
Saint Dionysius